Dickory Doc was a local children's television series which aired from 1966 to 1969.  The show was produced by Kaiser Broadcasting and broadcast on UHF Channel 48 WKBS-TV in Philadelphia,  Pennsylvania and on UHF Channel 56 WKBG-TV in Boston, Massachusetts and number of other major cities. The show was created by Aldo Farnese (Dickory Doc) and Chic Laganella.

Premise
In his toy shop at the North Pole he makes toys for Santa Claus to give away on Christmas Eve. He's assisted by his puppet elves Choo-Choo, Professor Schnitzel, Jingle Jim, Little Jock, Mr. Bigsby the Buka Bird and Riddles. Supermailman, who flies in delivering mail everyday and there are friends that drop by occasionally like Abby the Adorable Snowman and Puff the Flameless Dragon (A.K.A. Puffy).

The show was produced and created by Aldo Farnese (Dickory Doc) and Chic Laganella (Supermailman). They both supplied most of the voices of the puppets.

Albums
Two albums were produced at the time of the show:
 Dickory Doc with All His Friends.
 More Dickory Doc Vol.2.
Recorded Under the Direction of Chic Laganella and Aldo Farnese Produced by Buzz Curtis, Music Arranged & Conducted by Dick Caruso on an independent label "Piper Records". Album liner notes by Alan Baker.

After the show
Aldo went on to play "Adam Android," a futuristic space-traveler, also created and produced by Aldo Farnese and Chic Laganella and using most of the same puppets. Unlike the cold snowing setting of the North Pole, this show took place on a Spaceship.

Dickory Doc with all his Friends Album
Tracks

SIDE 1
 Theme-Introduction with Doc Choo-Choo sings “PLAYMATE”
 Doc & Jungle Jim Sing “A FROG HE WOULD A-WOO-ING GO”
 Mr. Bigsby Sings “ABC SONG”
 Doc & Little Jock Sing “FRERE JACQUES”
 Doc & Professor Schnitzel Sing “SCHNITZELBANK”

SIDE 2

 Doc Sings “THE FOX”
 Doc is Visited by Supermailman Supermailman Does “TAP DANCE”
 Doc Visits Abby—Doc & Abby sing “ON TOP OF OLD SMOKEY”
 Doc Visits Puffy—Puffy Sings “PUFF THE FLAMELESS DRAGON”
 Doc & All His Friends Sing “HAPPY BIRTHDAY”
 Doc Bids Farewell and Sings “CLOSING THEME”

See also
 Children's television series
 Puppetry
 Hand puppet
 The Dead Talk Back starring Aldo Farnese

References
 Amazon.com Hi There, Boys and Girls: America's Local Children's TV Programs (Paperback) by Tim Hollis (Author)
 TVparty.com Dickory Doc
 IMDB Aldo Farnese

External links
 Philadelphia at wikiPhilly
 Philadelphia Kids Shows
 Kaiserfield TV Blogspot
 Hi There! Boys and Girls: America's TV Shows Google Books
 Philly's Favorite Kids Show Hosts
 Philly's Favorite Kids Show Hosts - HobbyTalk
 WHYY TV12
 TCM-The Dead Talk Back

Local children's television programming in the United States
American television shows featuring puppetry
1960s American children's television series
1966 American television series debuts
1969 American television series endings
Culture of Philadelphia